George Arnot Maxwell (30 April 1859 – 25 June 1935) was an Australian lawyer and politician. He was one of Melbourne's leading barristers, specialising in criminal law. He was also a member of the House of Representatives from 1917 until his death in 1935.

Early life
Maxwell was born in Montrose, Forfarshire, Scotland and educated in Fife. He migrated to Australia with his family in 1875.  He worked briefly as a jackaroo and then completed his matriculation in Melbourne in 1881.

He subsequently taught at Melbourne schools, including Caulfield Grammar School, while studying arts and law at the University of Melbourne, where from 1884 he was a student of Trinity College. His early training and experiences for his later career as a barrister and politician can be seen in his student activities. In July 1884, he was, along with Trinity student Ernest Selwyn Hughes, a founder of the Shakspeare [sic] Society at the University of Melbourne, and he won the Sir Wigram Allen Prize for Oratory awarded by the Trinity College Dialectic Society in December the same year. In 1889, Maxwell was appointed Prelector of the College's debating society.

Barrister
Maxwell was admitted to the Victorian Bar in 1891 and developed a successful legal practice specialising in criminal law. He was eventually appointed King's Counsel (KC) in 1926. Arthur Dean regarded him as "beyond all question the greatest [Victorian] criminal advocate of modern times" and Robert Menzies described him as "the greatest criminal advocate I ever heard".

One of Maxwell's most notable cases was the Gun Alley Murder trial of 1921, where he had Tom Brennan as his junior. His client Colin Campbell Ross was convicted of the murder of a 12-year-old girl and subsequently executed, in what came to be regarded as a miscarriage of justice.

Political career
Maxwell ran unsuccessfully for various Victorian Legislative Assembly seats: Collingwood in 1891; Prahran in 1897; Warrnambool in 1900; Carlton in 1902 and Evelyn in 1914. However, he won the Labor-held Australian House of Representatives seat of Fawkner for the Nationalists at the 1917 election. In parliament, he disliked what he saw as the sectionalism of the Country and Labor parties and, following his conscience, he voted against the Bruce-Page government on a number of issues in 1929.  He was one of six Nationalists, including Billy Hughes, who brought the government down by voting against the maritime industries bill and as a result was unopposed by Labor at the 1929 election.  He joined Hughes's Australian Party, but resigned in May 1930 and sat as an Independent until he joined the United Australia Party in 1931.

Personal life
Maxwell married Jean Russell Ross in 1896—they had four daughters and one son. Maxwell lost sight in one eye in 1920 and most of the sight in the other in 1921, becoming totally blind in 1929.  Following his death at home in the Melbourne suburb of Canterbury, his seat of Fawkner was won by future Prime Minister Harold Holt.

See also
 List of Caulfield Grammar School people

Notes

People educated at Trinity College (University of Melbourne)
Members of the Australian House of Representatives for Fawkner
Members of the Australian House of Representatives
Nationalist Party of Australia members of the Parliament of Australia
Independent members of the Parliament of Australia
United Australia Party members of the Parliament of Australia
Australian barristers
1859 births
1935 deaths
People from Montrose, Angus
Blind politicians
Australian blind people
Australian Party members of the Parliament of Australia
20th-century Australian politicians
Scottish emigrants to colonial Australia
Australian King's Counsel